Halecostomi is the name of a group of neopterygian fish uniting the halecomorphs (represented by the living bowfin and many extinct groups) and the teleosts, the largest group of extant ray-finned fish.

The Halecostomi hypothesis and the Holostei hypothesis are two competing hypotheses explaining the evolutionary relationships of living ray-finned fish. The Holostei hypothesis is better supported, rendering the Halecostomi a paraphyletic group (i.e., rejecting the Halecostomi hypothesis). 

The Holostei hypothesis posits that Ginglymodi (gars and their fossil relatives) and Halecomorphi form a clade, called Holostei, and that the Holostei are the sister group to the Teleostei.

References

Neopterygii
Paraphyletic groups